Panavoor  is a village in Thiruvananthapuram district in the state of Kerala, India.

Demographics
 India census, Panavoor had a population of 20021 with 9671 males and 10350 females.

References

Villages in Thiruvananthapuram district